Raffles City Shanghai is a skyscraper in Shanghai, China. It is 222 m high, has 49 stories and was completed in 2003. Its base contains a shopping mall, with the tower devoted to office space.

See also
 List of tallest buildings in Shanghai

External links
 Raffles City
 

Buildings and structures completed in 2003
Shopping malls in Shanghai
Skyscrapers in Shanghai
Huangpu District, Shanghai
Skyscraper office buildings in Shanghai
CapitaLand